Minuscule 669 (in the Gregory-Aland numbering), ε 1025 (Soden), known as Benton Gospel 3, is a Greek minuscule manuscript of the New Testament, on parchment. It is dated palaeographically to the 11th century (or 10th century - Aland).
Scrivener labelled it by 902e.
The manuscript is lacunose.

Description 

The codex contains the text of the four Gospels on 272 parchment leaves, with some Lacunae (Matthew 1:1-27:58; Luke 1:1-2:16; John 1:1-14). The text is written in one column per page, 17 lines per page in minuscule letters.

The Ammonian sections were given at the margin, with a references to the Eusebian Canons.

The lists of the  precede Gospel of Mark and Gospel of Luke, the lists before Luke and John have not survived to the present day. The codex contains miniatures and decorated initial letters.

Text 

The Greek text of the codex is a representative of the Byzantine text-type. Hermann von Soden classified it to the Kx. Aland placed it in Category V.
According to the Claremont Profile Method it belongs to the textual family Family Kx in Luke 10 and Luke 20. In Luke 1 its text is defective.

The text of Luke 22:43.44 is marked by an obelus (÷) and John 5:3.4 is marked by an asterisk (※).

History 

The manuscript was written in Constantinople in the 10th century. The manuscript was brought to America in 1844 from Crete, by George Benton (along with Minuscule 670, and Lectionary 302). In 1913 it was presented to the General Theological Seminary in New York City.

The manuscript was added to the list of New Testament manuscripts by Scrivener and Gregory. It was examined by J. Rendel Harris.

Formerly it was part of Private Collection Ch. C. Ryrie in Dallas. It was sold at auction December 5, 2016, and now is in the collection at Dumbarton Oaks, Washington, DC.

Gallery

See also 

 List of New Testament minuscules
 Textual criticism

References

Further reading 

 J. R. Harris, Sunday School Times (Philadelphia, 4 June 1887), p. 355. 
 C. C. Edmunds, and W. H. P. Hatch, The Gospel Manuscripts of the General Theological Seminary, HTS 4 (1918), pp. 7, 50-68. 
 K. W. Clark, A Descriptive Catalogue of Greek New Testament Manuscripts in America (Chicago, 1937), pp. 83–85.

External links 

 Images of Minuscule 669 at the CSNTM

Greek New Testament minuscules
11th-century biblical manuscripts